Kurt Furgler (24 June 1924 – 23 July 2008) was a Swiss politician and member of the Swiss Federal Council (1972–1986).

He was elected to the Federal Council of Switzerland on 8 December 1971 and handed over office on 31 December 1986. He was affiliated to the Christian Democratic People's Party of Switzerland.

During his office time he held the following departments:
Federal Department of Justice and Police (1972–1982)
Federal Department of Economic Affairs (1983–1986)

He was President of the Confederation three times in 1977, 1981 and 1985.

Kurt Furgler was born and raised in St. Gallen, Switzerland. He studied Jurisprudence in Fribourg, Zürich, and Geneva, and was an avid handball player during his youth. In 1948, he obtained his license to practice law in St. Gallen. As a conservative centrist in the Federal Council of Switzerland, he advocated equal rights for women, and initiated economic reforms and modernized immigration and Swiss family law.

During his presidency, he argued for the European integration of Switzerland, and in 1982, signed the Luxembourg Declaration, which called for a closer cooperation between the European Union and the European Free Trade Association (EFTA). Dr. Furgler demanded a strong central government but failed to establish a Swiss federal police due to strong opposition from the left and confederated forces of the right.

In September 1982, he was the head of the special task force for the hostage situation in the Polish embassy in Bern. Controversially, he approved the clandestine copying of Polish diplomatic documents.

In November 1985, he asserted his significant representative role in international relations when he welcomed the American president Ronald Reagan, with first lady Nancy Reagan and General Secretary of the Communist Party of the Soviet Union Mikhail Gorbachev, for the first round of the arms control summit in Geneva.

Kurt Furgler resigned unexpectedly in 1986, but continued to serve in a number of committees, including the Club of Rome, InterAction Council, and the International Olympic Committee.

References

External links

1924 births
2008 deaths
Members of the Federal Council (Switzerland)
People from St. Gallen (city)
Graduate Institute of International and Development Studies alumni